Teresa Landucci Bandettini (also known by her Arcadian name Amarilli Etrusca; 11 August 1763 – 6 April 1837) was an Italian dancer, composer of extemporaneous verse, and poet, who is remembered as the Figurante Poetesca ("literary ballerina").

Life
Born in 1763 to Benedetto Bandettini and Maria Alba Micheli in Tuscany in the city of Lucca, Bandettini came from a humble background. She was an orphan by the age of seven and was first heard of as a dancer using the name "Amarilli Etrusca".

After Bandettini married Lucchese Pietro Landucci, whom she had met in Imola in 1789, her career shifted from dancing to improvisation. Her specialty was to create and deliver verse on the spot from random suggestions supplied by an audience willing to pay to witness her emotional delivery and the creative process. Bandettini's talents led to her finding a patron in Count Ludovico Savioli. He paid for an early poem concerning the "Death of Adonis" to be not only printed but to be illustrated by Francesco Rosaspina. Bandettini was a composer of extemporaneous verse, and a poet. Not surprisingly with her dancing background, she was known as the literary ballerina (Figurante Poetesca).  Although there were two publications of her improvised verses published in 1801 and 1807, Bandettini preferred to publish poetry that she had spent more time composing.

Legacy
Within Bandettini's lifetime she was acknowledged as an important writer. The noted Italian poet Maria Maddalena Morelli, also known as Corilla Olimpica, dedicated some of the last of her poetry to Bandettini. 
There are a number of paintings of Bandettini including an oil by Angelica Kauffman. Kauffman was a member of the Italian literary Society known as the Arcadian Academy. Kauffman respected Bandettini skills, and created the portrait which she gave to her in 1794. In 2002 it was discovered that the young composer Niccolò Paganini had dedicated six long lost sonatas to her. She died in Lucca in 1837.

Partial works

References

 Emilio De Tipaldo, Biografia degli italiani illustri, Tipografia di Alvisopoli, Venezia, 1837 
 E. Castreca Brunetti, Aggiunta alla Bibl. Femm. Ital. di P L. Ferri, Roma, 1844 
 Verona, Donne Illustri d'Italia, Colombo, Milano, 1864 
 Maria Bandivi Buti, Enciclopedia Biografica e Bibliografica Italiana, Ist. Ed. It., 1941–1942 
 Greco, Biblioteca Femminile Italiana del XIX Secolo, Venezia, 1875 
 N. Costa Zalessow, Scrittrici italiane dal XIII al XX secolo. Testi e critica, Longo 1982 
 M. Zaccan, Figure di Donne in Alcuni Testi del XVI Secolo, Appendici III, Venezia 1983 
 Alberto Macchi, Irene Parenti, atto unico teatrale tra realtà e ipotesi (Note), AETAS, Roma 2006 

1763 births
1837 deaths
Italian women poets
Italian female dancers
Italian ballerinas
18th-century Italian ballet dancers
19th-century Italian ballet dancers
18th-century Italian women
19th-century Italian women
Members of the Academy of Arcadians